Clark and McCullough were a comedy team consisting of comedians Bobby Clark and Paul McCullough.  They starred in a series of short films during the 1920s and 1930s.  Bobby Clark was the fast-talking wisecracker with painted-on eyeglasses; Paul McCullough was his easygoing assistant named Blodgett.

The two were childhood friends in Springfield, Ohio, and spent hours practicing tumbling and gymnastics in school. This led to their working as circus performers, then in vaudeville, and finally on Broadway. Their hit show The Ramblers (1926) was adapted as a Wheeler and Woolsey movie comedy, The Cuckoos. Clark and McCullough starred in the George Gershwin musical Strike Up the Band on Broadway in 1930.

Motion pictures
In 1928 Clark and McCullough entered the new field of talking pictures, with a series of short subjects and featurettes for Fox Film Corporation. In 1930 they signed with Radio Pictures (later RKO Radio Pictures) for six two-reel comedies annually. The RKO comedies are totally dominated by Clark, barging into every scene and monopolizing much of the conversation, with his good-natured buddy McCullough quietly embellishing his partner's antics with subtler gestures and actions. Each film cast the duo in different occupations, which they would tackle enthusiastically if not efficiently. The names of Clark's characters in their films were dictated by their jobs: as lawyers Clark and McCullough were Blackstone and Blodgett, as domestic help they were Cook and Blodgett, as photographers they were Flash and Blodgett. The films were re-released in the late 1940s.

Clark and McCullough filmed most of their movies during the summer months, so they could be free to do stage revues during the rest of the year. They appeared in three Broadway shows while their film contract was in force.

McCullough's death and beyond
Clark and McCullough had completed their last series of comedies in 1935, and McCullough sought treatment for severe depression. After he was released from a sanitarium in March 1936, McCullough visited a barber shop where he grabbed a razor, and committed suicide by cutting his throat and wrists. Clark was forced to pursue a solo career; he appeared in Samuel Goldwyn's 1938 musical comedy The Goldwyn Follies, and reestablished himself on Broadway as a solo comedian in such revues as Streets of Paris and Mexican Hayride. Clark continued to appear on stage and television into the 1950s; he died in 1960.

Films

References

American comedy duos
Vaudeville performers
American male film actors
1880s births